Mount Hedden is a nunatak  high lying  north of Brattskarvet Mountain in the Sverdrup Mountains of Queen Maud Land, Antarctica. The name "Hedden-Berg" after Karl Hedden, a sailor with the expedition, was applied in the area by the Third German Antarctic Expedition (1938–39) under Alfred Ritscher. The correlation of the name with this nunatak may be arbitrary but is recommended for the sake of international uniformity and historical continuity.

References

External links

Mountains of Queen Maud Land
Princess Martha Coast